Una Hanbury (née Rawnsley), (1904–1990) was an American sculptor best known for her bronze portraits.

Hanbury was born Una Rawnsley in the English town of Staines and grew up primarily in Kent. Her grandfather was Hardwicke Rawnsley. After graduation from London's Polytechnic School of Art, she studied for three years at the Royal Academy of Arts. Jacob Epstein was her most influential teacher. She moved to Washington, D.C. in 1944 to work for the British Embassy. After taking time off for her family, Hanbury resumed her art career in the mid-1960s. She had one-person exhibitions at the Folger Shakespeare Library and the National Portrait Gallery in Washington in 1971. In 1970 she moved to Santa Fe, New Mexico, where she stayed until her death in 1990. Her papers are in the Smithsonian Archives of American Art.

Personal life
In 1926 she married Anthony H. R. C. Hanbury, whom she later divorced. In 1957 she married Alan Coatsworth Brown. Her grandson, Colin Poole, is also an artist.

Public collections

 Smithsonian Institution
 Wheelwright Museum
 National Portrait Gallery (United States)
 Royal Academy, London
 Kennedy Center
 Wheelwright Museum
 Museum of Northern Arizona
 Neuac Sculpture Park (Arandjelovac, Serbia)

References

1904 births
1990 deaths
20th-century American sculptors
American women sculptors
British emigrants to the United States
Artists from Santa Fe, New Mexico
Alumni of the Royal Academy Schools
Académie Julian alumni
Alumni of the Académie de la Grande Chaumière
People from Staines-upon-Thames
Sculptors from New Mexico
20th-century American women artists